The white-bellied bustard or white-bellied korhaan (Eupodotis senegalensis) is an African species of bustard. It is widespread in sub-Saharan Africa in grassland and open woodland habitats.

Description

All are tawny brown above and on the breast and white on the belly, with cream-coloured legs; juveniles have light brown necks and heads, and adults have blue-grey necks. The adult female has a grey crown, a brown and buff line below the eye, and black speckling on the throat. The adult male has a black crown, black lines on the white cheeks, a black throat patch, and a pinkish-red bill. The call, often given in the early morning and late evening, has been described as "a very loud, guttural k'whuka WHUKa, k'wuka WHUKa..., or k'warrak, k'warrak...

This species is usually seen in pairs or family groups, as young stay with their parents much longer than those of other bustards in the region.

Subspecies
Five subspecies are recognized:

 E. s. senegalensis (Vieillot, 1820) – southwestern Mauritania and Guinea, east to Central African Republic, central Sudan, and perhaps Eritrea (Senegal bustard)
 E. s. canicollis (Reichenow, 1881) – Ethiopia south to northeastern Tanzania
 E. s. erlangeri (Reichenow, 1905) – southern Kenya and western Tanzania
 E. s. mackenziei C.M.N. White, 1945 – eastern Gabon and central Democratic Republic of the Congo to Zambia, Angola and northern Namibia
 E. s. barrowii (J.E. Gray, 1829, sometimes considered a distinct species) – Botswana, Eswatini, South Africa, and Lesotho (Barrow's korhaan)

References

 White-bellied bustard, Birdlife International

External links
 White-bellied bustard - Species text in The Atlas of Southern African Birds

Eupodotis
Birds of Sub-Saharan Africa
Birds described in 1820
Taxa named by Louis Jean Pierre Vieillot
Taxonomy articles created by Polbot